Azaspirodecanedione is a chemical compound.

It is a component of the chemical structures of several of the azapirones.

See also 
 Azapirone
 Azaspirodecane
 Glutarimide
 Ketone
 Spirodecanedione

Azapirones
Imides
Cyclopentanes
Spiro compounds